Novosyolka is a rural locality (a village) in Karaidelsky Selsoviet, Karaidelsky District, Bashkortostan, Russia. The population was 24 as of 2010. There are 10 streets.

Geography 
Novosyolka is located 7 km northeast of Karaidel (the district's administrative centre) by road. Karaidel is the nearest rural locality.

References 

Rural localities in Karaidelsky District